Thunderlord! is a 2016 science fiction novel written by Deborah J. Ross. Although the 24rd novel published in the Darkover saga, it is the third book in chronological order.

Plot
A generation after a time period known in the Darkover universe as The Age of Chaos a character by the name Gwynn has lost his family in the conflict. His life's ambition has become plotting revenge against those who caused his family's loss. He seeks to marry a woman with the genetic power to control the storms, in hopes that his offspring will use it to against Aldaran.

Kyria, his selected bride is attracted to Gwynn because of his financial status and other reasons. During her journey through the mountains to Scathfell, where she will formally wed, she and her sister come across Edric, a young heir to Aldaran. Edric also possesses the power to control thunderstorms, a power he has been warned to be cautious of because of the mass danger it poses to all.

Their companionship brings them closer and creates an opportunity for their arch-rival kingdoms to unite.

References

External links
 Having Fun With Women Characters in Thunderlord (aka "Jane Austen on Darkover") by Deborah J. Ross
 

Darkover books
2016 American novels
American science fiction novels
2016 science fiction novels
DAW Books books
Novels by Deborah J. Ross